The 2011 European Beach Handball Championship was held in Umag, Croatia from 4–9 July. Croatia was the defending men's champion, while Italy was the defending women's champion.

Draw
The group draw was held for both genders was held on 25 May 2011.

Men

Preliminary round

Group A

July 4, 2011

July 5, 2011

Group B

July 4, 2011

July 5, 2011

Group C

July 4, 2011

July 5, 2011

Main Round

Group I

July 6, 2011

July 7, 2011

Group II

July 6, 2011

July 7, 2011

Consolation round

Places 13–15

Group III

July 7, 2011

July 8, 2011

Places 9–12

Group IV

July 8, 2011

Knockout stage 
Championship bracket

5th place bracket

Women

Preliminary round

Group A

July 4, 2011

July 5, 2011

July 6, 2011

Group B

July 4, 2011

July 5, 2011

July 6, 2011

Main Round

Group I

July 7, 2011

Group II

July 7, 2011

Consolation round

Places 9–14

Group III

July 7, 2011

July 8, 2011

Knockout stage 
Championship bracket

5th place bracket

References

Men's results 
Women's results

External links

European Beach Handball Championship
European Beach Handball Championship
2011 European Beach Handball Championship
European Beach Handball Championship
2011 in European sport